Reaching for Tomorrow is the third album by R&B/funk band Switch, released in 1980 by Gordy Records. The album reached No. 23 on the Billboard Top Soul Albums chart.

Overview
Reaching for Tomorrow was recorded at Jennifudy Recording Studio, Motown/Hitsville U.S.A studios, Caribou Ranch studios and Kendun Recording Studios.

During July 2019, an expanded edition of Reaching for Tomorrow was released digitally. Along with the album's reissue came a bonus track entitled "Tahiti Hut" featuring Jermaine Jackson. The song was produced by Jackson with Bobby DeBarge also singing falsetto on the track.

Track listing
"Power to Dance" (Bobby DeBarge, Bunny DeBarge)
"My Friend in the Sky" (Bobby DeBarge, Bunny DeBarge)
"Don't Take My Love Away" (Bobby DeBarge)
"Keep Movin' On" (Gregory Williams)
"A Brighter Tomorrow" (Eddie Fluellen, Hazel Jackson, Jermaine Jackson)
"Reaching for Tomorrow" (Jermaine Jackson, Paul M. Jackson, Jr., Roxanne Seeman)
"I Finally Found Somebody New" (Tommy DeBarge)
"Honey, I Love You" (Jody Sims)
"Get Back to You" (Gregory Williams, Jody Sims)
"Tahiti Hut" (Maurice White, Eumir Deodato, Roxanne Seeman) (feat. Jermaine Jackson)(bonus track on expanded edition) 5:18

Charts

References 

1980 albums
Switch (band) albums
Gordy Records albums